Mutant Herd is an action game written by Jeremy Smith for the VIC-20 and published by Thorn EMI in 1983.

Gameplay

Mutant Herd involves protecting a powerhouse from an invasion of mutants.  The mutants crawl towards you from multiple burrows located at each corner of the screen. Using laser beams, you need to prevent the mutant herds from destroying your powerhouse.

The game was even more complicated than this, however, as it was possible to enter the burrows and to shut them down.  Once a burrow was entered, you started another phase of the game.  A queen mutant and her eggs are hiding in each burrow.  You must get to the eggs and plant an explosive charge, while avoiding the queen mutant, who can kill you or move your charge away from her eggs.  Once you have succeeded in blowing up the eggs, the burrow is sealed.  When you return to the powerhouse screen, you will have one less burrow spewing mutants at you.

The game was even more complicated yet, in that, after each burrow is sealed, your lasers get weaker and the next burrow will have more eggs and be more challenging.  You will have won the game when you have sealed all the burrows and successfully protected your powerhouse.

Reception
COMPUTE! wrote that "There are enough little problems to always keep you thinking about what you'll have to do next". Electronic Games stated that Mutant Herd "may not be the ultimate VIC-20 game, but the graphics are fun, the action is challenging, and it takes at least one step off the beaten game-track". Ahoy! called it "a two-part arcade game with a unique twist", favorably reviewing the graphics, sound, animation, and gameplay.

References

VIC-20 games
VIC-20-only games
1983 video games
Video games developed in the United Kingdom